Frozen pension may refer to:

 Frozen Occupational Pension, a pensions which have been left behind by people who are no longer employed by the sponsoring employer.
 Frozen state pension, practice of the British government in "freezing" state pensions for pensioners who live in certain overseas countries.